Supachok Sarachat (born 22 May 1998) is a Thai professional footballer who plays as an attacking midfielder or a winger. He represents the Thailand national team, and plays at club-level for J1 League club Hokkaido Consadole Sapporo.

Club career

Buriram United
Sarachat switched to Consadole Sapporo on loan in July 2022 from Buriram United, for whom he has made 150 league appearances in total, scoring 34 goals and providing seven assists. Last season for Buriram United, Sarachat made 26 Thai League 1 appearances, scored five goals and provided five assists.

Hokkaido Consadole Sapporo
He joined the club on loan from Buriram United at 1 July 2022. He featured in seven J1 League matches, coming from the bench at each match. Despite no starts, and earning just 93 minutes of action throughout the matches combined, he gave three assists. Having impressed enough, he was permanently signed by Consadole in a five-year contract, which extends from 12 November 2022 to 31 December 2027.

International career
In 2021, he was called up for the 2020 AFF Championship by Head Coach Alexandré Pölking.

Career statistics

Club

International statistics

International

International Goals

Senior

Under-23

Under-19

Personal life
Supachok has two younger brothers: Suphanat Mueanta, a striker for Buriram United, and Chotika Mueanta, a member of the Buriram United Academy. Supachok uses his mother's surname, Sarachart.

Honours

Club
Buriram United
 Thai League 1
  Champions (4) : 2015, 2017, 2018, 2021–22
 Thai FA Cup
  Winner (2) : 2015, 2021–22 
 Thai League Cup
  Winner (3) : 2015, 2016, 2021–22
 Thailand Champions Cup
  Champions (1) : 2019
 Toyota Premier Cup
  Winner (1) : 2016
 Mekong Club Championship
  Winner (2) : 2015, 2016

International
Thailand
 AFF Championship
  Winner (1) : 2020

Individual
 FA Thailand Award
 Young player of the Year (1) : 2017

References

External links

1998 births
Living people
Supachok Sarachat
Supachok Sarachat
Association football midfielders
Supachok Sarachat
Supachok Sarachat
Supachok Sarachat
Supachok Sarachat
Supachok Sarachat
Supachok Sarachat
Footballers at the 2018 Asian Games
Supachok Sarachat
Competitors at the 2019 Southeast Asian Games
Supachok Sarachat